Maiyü is a township in Zogang County the Tibet Autonomous Region of China.

See also
List of township-level divisions of the Tibet Autonomous Region

Populated places in Chamdo
Township-level divisions of Tibet